The 2012–13 Morgan State Bears men's basketball team represented Morgan State University during the 2012–13 NCAA Division I men's basketball season. The Bears, led by seventh year head coach Todd Bozeman, played their home games at the Talmadge L. Hill Field House and were members of the Mid-Eastern Athletic Conference. They finished the season 17–15, 10–6 in MEAC play to finish in fifth place. They advanced to the championship game of the MEAC tournament where they lost to North Carolina A&T.

Roster

Schedule

|-
!colspan=9| Regular season

|-
!colspan=9| 2013 MEAC men's basketball tournament

References

Morgan State Bears men's basketball seasons
Morgan State
Morgan
Morgan